The boys’ 3000 m competition at the 2014 Summer Youth Olympics was held on 20–24 August 2014 in Nanjing Olympic Sports Center.

Schedule

Results

Heat
First 50% of the athletes from the Qualification round progress to the A Final and the remaining athletes to the B Final.

Finals

Final A

Final B

References

Athletics at the 2014 Summer Youth Olympics